These Guys Are from England and Who Gives a Shit is the 2001 re-release of the U2 EP by Negativland. It contains both tracks from the original EP, plus some tracks from the 1989 Over the Edge broadcasts on which the original EP was based, as well as live tracks recorded at the Great American Music Hall in San Francisco. The album was called a "bootleg" and released under "Seelard Records" as a joke, but in fact it was a real release by the band. Several of the live tracks on the album contain the same samples of a profane Casey Kasem as had appeared on the U2 EP set to a different musical arrangement, which includes a spoken portion which in part borrows from the lyrics of "(I Can't Get No) Satisfaction".  Other live tracks made reference to the band's battle with SST Records and to the 1960 U-2 incident.

Track listings
Tracks 3 and 4 are from the original 1991 EP.

Note: After 8:56 of silence, track 11 contains a further profanity-laced 17 seconds of Casey Kasem's voice.

See also
 The Letter U and the Numeral 2
 Fair Use: The Story of the Letter U and the Numeral 2

References

2001 compilation albums
Negativland albums